Lembus is one of the tribes of kalenjin people. Lembus tribe is sub-divided to Pokor, Keben, Bogor, Kakimor,  Kamaruso, Somek, Murkaptuk, Agiekablembus, Chepkero, Kipkosom and Chepkosom. 
They settled in Emom, Chepkero, ElKamaruso, Elkakimor, ElKeben, ElBogor, Lembus Mosop, Lembus, Soi, Lembus Kingasis, Lembus, Kiltuiya and lembus East and west. Other areas are Keiyo and Laikipia.
Etc.

The Lembus people are perceived to be closely related to the Tugen, but this assertion has been rejected by the Lembus themselves, and their Lembus Council of Elders based on migration history, cultural practice and language Members of the Lembus community insist that Tugen is just a name coined in the 1960s to unite the small communities living in Baringo. In 2019 the lembus people moved to court demanding to be recognized as a distinct ethnic group and not as a sub-tribe of the Tugen

The Lembus and Nandi peoples
Lembus People have had close relationship with the Nandi dating back to precolonial period. It is also notable that Lembus People and the Nandi share a lot of cultural, language and religious similarities. In the 1890s, the Lembus People resisted the British entry into Lembus territories and especially the Lembus Forest. The resistance by the Lembus also coincided with the Nandi Resistance to the British in the late 1890s to 1906. The British administrators in Eldama Ravine also accused the Lembus People of collusion with their Nandi brothers and cousins to fight the British.

References

Further reading
Lembus Community

Ethnic groups in Kenya